José Alberto Percudani (born 22 March 1965) is an Argentine former footballer who played as a striker.

Club career
Between 1982 and 1988 he played for Independiente, winning both the Libertadores Cup and the Intercontinental Cup in 1984 with the team. In the Intercontinental Cup final he scored the only goal against Liverpool FC, and was also elected as Man of the Match.

In 1988, he was signed by Austria Wien, as a replacement for Toni Polster. In the 1988/89 season he scored 23 goals, with which he came in third on the top goalscorers list in Austria. However, with Austria having four foreign players in their squad and rules then allowing only two to play at the same time, he later lost his place in the team, and in 1990 he moved to Atlético Madrid.

From Atlético he moved to Universidad Católica in Chile, where he scored the winning goal for the team in the 1991 Copa Chile final. He then moved to play for Peñarol in Uruguay, before returning to Argentina, and playing for Estudiantes La Plata, Almirante Brown and Talleres de Remedios de Escalada.

International career
In 1987 he was called to play on the Copa América for the Argentina national team, being part of the attacking section of the team along with Diego Maradona and Claudio Caniggia.

Honours

Club
Independiente
Copa Libertadores (1): 1984
Intercontinental Cup (1): 1984

Universidad Católica
Copa Chile (1): 1991

Individual
Intercontinental Cup Man of the Match (1): 1984

External links
 * José Alberto Percudani, Austria Wien Archiv - Die Online Statistik, per 2016-07-01.
José Alberto Percudani at BDFA.com.ar 
Copa América 1987 squads

1965 births
Living people
Sportspeople from Buenos Aires Province
Argentine footballers
Argentine expatriate footballers
Argentina international footballers
1987 Copa América players
Club Atlético Independiente footballers
Talleres de Remedios de Escalada footballers
FK Austria Wien players
Atlético Madrid footballers
Estudiantes de La Plata footballers
Peñarol players
Club Deportivo Universidad Católica footballers
Copa Libertadores-winning players
Expatriate footballers in Chile
Expatriate footballers in Spain
Expatriate footballers in Uruguay
Expatriate footballers in Austria
Argentine expatriate sportspeople in Spain
Argentine expatriate sportspeople in Austria
Argentine Primera División players
La Liga players
Austrian Football Bundesliga players
Association football forwards